ČSD Class E 458.1 is a class of electric locomotive were used for shunting and local trip working in former Czechoslovakia. Locomotives which passed to České dráhy, rail operator in the Czech Republic are now classified as Class 111. E 458.1 locomotives operate solely on the 3,000 V DC electrification system. They are fitted with thyristor control. ČSD Class S 458.0 and ČSD Class E 458.0 are similar locomotives operating on 25 kV AC and 3,000 V DC respectively.

See also
List of České dráhy locomotive classes

References

External links 
Lokomotivní řada 111 ČD (E 458.1 ČSD) in Czech

Škoda locomotives
Bo′Bo′ locomotives
3000 V DC locomotives 
Electric locomotives of Czechoslovakia
Electric locomotives of the Czech Republic
Railway locomotives introduced in 1979
Standard gauge locomotives of Czechoslovakia
Standard gauge locomotives of the Czech Republic

Bo′Bo′ electric locomotives of Europe